Krani is a village in the Resen Municipality in North Macedonia, roughly  south of the municipal centre of Resen.

History
Krani has four known archaeological sites, two of which are from the Middle Ages, one from Late Antiquity, and one from the Hellenistic era. The latter was a fishing settlement and the two from the Middle Ages were churches.

In 1905, Arvati's population consisted of 256 Bulgarian Exarchists and 342 Albanians. There was a Bulgarian school in the village.

Demographics
Krani is inhabited by a Sunni Muslim Albanian majority and an Orthodox Macedonian minority. A small number of Albanian speaking Muslim Romani used to live in Krani and during the latter decades of the 20th century have migrated to Ohrid and Resen. In the late Ottoman period, some Bektashi Albanians, known locally as Kolonjarë, used to also reside in the village of Krani. As of the most recent national census in 2002, Krani has 416 residents, less than half of its 1961 population.

The data on the mother tongues of Krani's residents, according to the 2002 census, is very similar to the ethnic makeup of the village with 311 declaring Albanian their mother tongue, followed by 104 declaring Macedonian, and one declaring Serbian.

Religion
The main religions in the village are Islam and Orthodox Christianity, with 309 belonging to the former and 105 to the latter, as of the latest census. Additionally, two individuals declared Catholicism as their religion. These figures suggest that the ethnic Macedonian population is Orthodox Christian, while the Albanian population is Muslim, as is the case nationally.

Krani has two churches, the Church of the Dormition of the Virgin Mary and the Church of St Nicholas. It also has one mosque.

Gallery

People from Krani 
Ali Aliu (born 1934), writer and translator

References

Villages in Resen Municipality
Albanian communities in North Macedonia